Norma Maldonado (born August 2, 1962) is an American television and film actress. She has had roles in series such as Crossing Jordan and ER, and appeared in the Heroes web-based spin-off, Heroes: Destiny.
She also starred in the movie Our Boys, directed by Leonardo Ricagni. She played the role of Rosa.

Filmography

Film

Television

Video games

References

External links

Norma Maldonado official website

1962 births
Actresses from New York City
American actresses of Puerto Rican descent
American film actresses
American television actresses
American video game actresses
American voice actresses
Living people
University of Georgia alumni
University of Puerto Rico alumni
20th-century American actresses
21st-century American actresses